Darian Leader (born 1965) is a British psychoanalyst and author.

Biography
Leader was educated at St Paul's School in London, studied philosophy at Downing College, Cambridge and then he earned an M.A. in history of science in Paris (at Paris VIII), where he also trained as an analyst. He is a founding member of the Centre for Freudian Analysis and Research (CFAR).

Darian Leader was president of the College of Psychoanalysts, a trustee of the Freud Museum, and honorary visiting professor in psychoanalysis at Roehampton University. In 2015 he received the Mercier Chair at the University of Louvain for his work in psychoanalysis.

Works
 Lacan for Beginners, 1995, later editions with a changed title: Introducing Lacan (2000, 2005)
 Why Do Women Write More Letters Than they Post?, 1996
 Promises Lovers Make When It Gets Late, 1997
 Freud's Footnotes, 2000
 Stealing the Mona Lisa: What Art Stops Us from Seeing, 2002
 Why Do People Get Ill? Exploring the Mind-Body-Connection (with David Corfield), 2007
 The New Black. Mourning, Melancholia and Depression, 2008
 What Is Madness?, 2011
 Strictly Bipolar, 2013
 Hands: What We Do With Them – and Why, 2016
Why Can't We Sleep?, 2019
Jouissance: Sexuality, Suffering and Satisfaction. 2021

A list of journal articles can be found here.

References

Living people
Alumni of Downing College, Cambridge
English writers
British psychoanalysts
1965 births
People from Alameda County, California